Sungai Lalang  (abbreviated Sg. Lalang) is a small town in Kuala Muda District, Kedah, Malaysia. It is located 5 kilometer north from Sungai Petani. Sg. Lalang River (Sungai Sg. Lalang) situated in this town flows into the Merbok River (Sungai Merbok).

Postcodes 
People in Sungai Lalang uses two different postcodes; the west side of Sungai Lalang falls in Merbok electoral district and uses the postcode of Bedong, 08100 whereas the east side falls in Sungai Petani electoral district and uses postcode of Northern Sungai Petani, 08000. Generally, either postcodes are safe to use in the whole area of Sungai Lalang regardless electoral district; older generations tend to use Bedong's postcode because there is no post office in Sungai Lalang in the old days and they used to go to Bedong each time they need a post office, younger generations tend to use Sungai Petani's postcode. Nowadays, there is a mini post office in Taman Bandar Baru Sungai Lalang and the Mail Processing Centre Sungai Petani (Pusat Mel Sungai Petani) is built in Kawasan Perusahaan Sungai Lalang.

Residency 
Sungai Lalang houses a few sections of neighbourhood parks (taman) and a few villages (kampung), they are as follow:
 Aman Suria
 Ambangan Heights
 Bukit Bayu
 Bukit Lembu
 Kampung Baru Sungai Lalang (North, South)
 Kampung Ikan Bilis
 Kampung Pinang Dalam
 Kampung Pinang Luar
 Kampung Sebelas
 Kampung Sungai Getah
 Kampung Tanah Seribu
 Permata Hill Park
 Seroja Parkhomes
 Taman Aman Jaya
 Taman Bandar Baru Sungai Lalang
 Taman Bayu Indah
 Taman Bistari Jaya
 Taman Bistari Utama
 Taman Gemilang
 Taman Desa Aman
 Taman Desa Budiman
 Taman Desa Permai
 Taman Lembah Permai
 Taman Makmur
 Taman Merpati
 Taman Palma Aman
 Taman Perbandaran Sungai Tukang
 Taman Permai Bistari
 Taman Seri Bayu
 Taman Seroja
 Taman Sri Wangi
 Taman Sungai Lalang

Stores and Services 
Most of the residencies in Sungai Lalang has a few dedicated lot or blocks for stores and services. A few notable store and services available in Sungai Lalang includes:
 7-Eleven convenient store
 Caltex petrol station
 Fresh market of Sungai Lalang
 Pasar Malam Ambangan Heights
 Pasar Malam Bandar Baru Sungai Lalang
 Pasar Malam Taman Desa Aman Sungai Lalang
 Pasar Malam Taman Desa Permai Sungai Lalang
 Perodua vehicle service centre
 Petronas petrol station
 Police station of Sungai Lalang
 Pusat Mel Sungai Petani (Mail Processing Centre Sungai Petani)
 Shell Sungai Lalang petrol station
 Shell Aman Jaya petrol station
 YaPEIM store

Industry 
The following industrial areas are situated in Sungai Lalang:
 Kawasan Perindustrian Sungai Lalang
 Kawasan Perusahaan MIEL Sungai Lalang
 Kawasan Perusahaan Ringan Desa Aman

Education 

Sungai Lalang has a few primary schools:
 SK Aman Jaya, school code: KBA3006
 SK Ambangan Heights, formerly known as SK Bandar Baru Sungai Lalang 2, school code: KBA3054
 SK Bandar Baru Sungai Lalang, school code: KBA3047
 SK Sungai Lalang, school code: KBA3016
 SK Sungkap Para, school code: KBA3017
 SJK (C) Chung Hwa Sungai Lalang, school code: KBC3061
 SJK (T) Ladang Sungkap Para, school code: KBD3083
 SJK (T) Sungai Getah, school code: KBD3095
 SJK (T) Tun Sambanthan, school code: KBD3085

Sungai Lalang only has one secondary school:
 SMK Aman Jaya, school code KEA3111

References 

Kuala Muda District
Towns in Kedah